Ante Björkebaum (born 14 April 1988) is a retired Swedish footballer.

References

External links 
 

Swedish footballers
Allsvenskan players
1988 births
Living people
Ope IF players
Östersunds FK players
IK Sirius Fotboll players
Association football forwards